My Agenda is the second studio album by American singer-songwriter Dorian Electra, released on October 16, 2020. Promoted by the singles "Sorry Bro (I Love You)", "Give Great Thanks", "Gentleman", "M'Lady", "Edgelord", and the title track, the full project was revealed on September 21, 2020. The album features appearances from Rebecca Black, Faris Badwan, Pussy Riot, Village People, The Garden, Dylan Brady, Clarence Clarity and Quay Dash among others.

A deluxe edition containing seven remixes and four new songs was released on November 5, 2021.

Background and composition
The album was conceived mostly during two writing sessions with Count Baldor and Dylan Brady, one in Las Vegas and another in a castle in Barnstaple. Due to the COVID-19 pandemic Electra recorded most of the vocals in a home studio.

My Agenda is a hyperpop, experimental pop, protest-pop, pop, nu metal, and dubstep album that features elements of heavy metal, glitch pop, techno, baroque pop, trance, bubblegum bass, EDM, happy hardcore, gregorian chant, deconstructed club, trap, hardstyle, shock rock, europop, hardcore, and viking metal.

The album is a concept album about toxic masculinity and incels as seen "through a queer lens". The title of My Agenda is a reference to the "gay agenda" and the title song is written "from the perspective of a conspiracy theorist who is watching their country being taken over by a gay dictator".

Critical reception

My Agenda received mostly positive reviews from music critics. American Songwriter praised My Agenda, giving the project five stars. Commenting on the record's ability to blend political themes, musical experimentation, and pop hooks, the publication noted that "Electra presents a mosaic look on today's cultural confusion while retaining a sense of fun. For example, the project's lead single, 'Sorry Bro (I Love You)', plays with themes of sexuality and gender in a normalizing way that presents homoeroticism as something cute and fun, as opposed to shameful."

The album was ranked as the 48th best album of 2020 by Uproxx and the 16th best by Flood. The title track was included on Billboard list of the best LGBTQ songs of 2020.

Track listing

Release history

References

2020 albums
Dorian Electra albums
Albums produced by Dylan Brady
Albums produced by Sega Bodega
Albums recorded in a home studio
Concept albums
Political music albums by American artists
Self-released albums